Samuel D. Thompson (born July 31, 1935) is an American Democratic Party politician who has served in the New Jersey Senate since January 2012, representing the 12th Legislative district. Prior to redistricting in 2011, he served in the General Assembly from 1998 to 2012, representing the 13th district.

Facing a difficult primary over his age, Thompson switched parties in February 2023 and will seek re-election as a Democrat. He however reversed his decision and announced on February 27,  that he won't run for re-election

Early life 
Thompson was born in Mobile, Alabama and attended public schools in Alabama, Louisiana, and Arkansas. He reached the rank of Specialist Third Class while serving in the U.S. Army from 1955 through 1957. He received a B.S. in 1960 from the University of Arkansas in chemistry and mathematics and was awarded a Ph.D. in 1965 from Louisiana State University in physical chemistry. He worked as a research chemist at duPont and J.P. Stevens and Company and was employed by the New Jersey Department of Health from 1972 to 1994 as a chemist and director of clinical laboratory improvement service. He served on the United States Armed Forces Epidemiological Board from 1983 to 1990. He was appointed by then Governor of New Jersey Christine Todd Whitman to serve on the Governor's Education Task Force in 1994 as Co-Chair. He served on the New Jersey Turnpike Authority from 1994 to 1997 as director of communications and formerly as director of planning, analysis and government relations. Thompson has served on the New Jersey Advisory Council on Elder Care since 1998, served on the Continuing Care Advisory Council from 1998 to 2002 and on the New Jersey State Council for Adult Literacy Services from 2000 to 2002. He currently resides in Old Bridge Township and is married to the former Jacqueline P. Haycock.

Early political career 
Thompson was chair of the Middlesex County Republican Organization from 1987 until 1994 and was a delegate to every Republican National Convention from 1988 through 2012.

New Jersey Assembly 
Thompson was first elected to the General Assembly in 1997 in the northern Monmouth County and northeastern Middlesex County-based 13th district. He served as the Assistant Republican Assembly Leader from 2004 to 2005. He served in the Assembly on the Appropriations Committee and the Human Services Committee.

New Jersey Senate

Elections

2011 election
Following the reapportionment of the legislative districts for the 2010 Census, Thompson's hometown of Old Bridge was moved to the new 12th district which was spread across the counties of Burlington, Ocean, Monmouth, and Middlesex. The four Republican county committees endorsed Thompson to be the Senator from the new district and was elected in the 2011 general election defeating Democrat Robert "Bob" Brown.

2017 election

Thompson defeated challenger Art Haney in the June 3, 2021 primary and Democrat David Lande in the general election.

Tenure
He sits on three Senate committees (Budget and Appropriations, Environment and Energy, and State Government, Wagering, Tourism & Historic Preservation) and two joint committees (Housing Affordability and Public Schools). In May 2017, Thompson introduced a bill to designate Streptomyces griseus as New Jersey's State Microbe, to be added to the state's other state symbols. S. griseus was chosen for this honor because it is a New Jersey native that made unique contributions to healthcare and scientific research worldwide. A strain of S. griseus that produced the antibiotic streptomycin was discovered in New Jersey in 1916 and developed into an antibiotic by a Rutgers University team by Albert Schatz and Selman Waksman in 1943. A companion bill was introduced in the Assembly in June 2017 by Annette Quijano. During the 2019 budget fight, Democrats passed a budget without Governor Phil Murphy's millionaires tax. Thompson was one of six Republicans to vote for the budget.

Committees 
Joint Committee on Housing Affordability
Joint Committee on the Public Schools
Budget and Appropriations
Education
State Government, Wagering, Tourism & Historic Preservation

District 12 
Each of the 40 districts in the New Jersey Legislature has one representative in the New Jersey Senate and two members in the New Jersey General Assembly. The representatives from the 12th District for the 2022—23 Legislative Session are:
 Senator Samuel D. Thompson (D)
 Assemblyman Robert D. Clifton (R)
 Assemblyman Alex Sauickie (R)

Electoral history

Senate

Assembly

References

External links
Senator Sam Thompson's Official Site
Senator Thompson's legislative web page, New Jersey Legislature
New Jersey Legislature financial disclosure forms – 2016 2015 2014 2013 2012 2011  2010 2009 2008 2007 2006 2005 2004
Assembly Member Samuel D. 'Sam' Thompson, Project Vote Smart

1935 births
Living people
Louisiana State University alumni
Republican Party members of the New Jersey General Assembly
Republican Party New Jersey state senators
People from Old Bridge Township, New Jersey
Politicians from Middlesex County, New Jersey
Politicians from Mobile, Alabama
University of Arkansas alumni
21st-century American politicians